Lough Lene (Irish: Loch Léinn) is a lake situated in north County Westmeath, Ireland, between the villages of Castlepollard, Collinstown and Fore.

It possesses a rich and varied history. It also boasts the existence of prehistoric burial sites, old ruins, many ancient village-type communal circular dwellings locally called ringforts, stiles, and mass paths. Lough Lene also has claims to being the home to kings and Vikings, such as Turgesius who had one of his forts upon the hill on the southwest overlooking the lake from the Ranaghan side, before being killed by Máel Sechnaill mac Maíl Ruanaid.

Legend & history
The name of the lake has appeared in a variety of ways including Lane, Léin and Leibhinn. Sir Henry Piers believed the lake's name translated as Lake of Learning, tying in with his translation of Fore as the Town of Books. However, other sources seem more inclined to the tradition that the lake was named after the daughter of the fabled Manannán mac Lir (see Children of Lir).

A freshwater lake, most sources focus on the clarity of the water, with the term "gin clear" being used frequently to describe it. It sits approximately 97 metres (312 ft) above sea level and covers approximately 500 hectares. It plays a vital part in local life from being the water supply for Collinstown to playing an essential part in the social, historical and recreational life of the area.

Nun's Island on Lough Lene was once the site of a convent. Baile na gCailleach, the old Irish name for the town of Collinstown, when translated means "the town of the veiled women, or "the town of the old hags". This was an irreverent name which referred to the nuns of the convent on the island.

The two other islands are Castle Island, and Turgesius Island.
An ancient bell was found on Castle Island in 1881 and is now in the National Museum of Ireland. A half size reproduction of the ancient bell was presented to Dáil Éireann in 1931 by the widow of a former member of the House, Bryan Cooper, and it has since been the bell of the Ceann Comhairle (Chairperson) of Dáil Éireann.

A survey revealed that Nun's Island was a complex stone structure with causeway-like features, while Castle Island showed the best potential, with a large assemblage of worked timbers. Two logboats were also recovered in 1968, one with dovetail joints. This work continues today. These Roman-period log-boats were constructed for lake fishing, and were about 8 m long, 1.5 m wide, and 80 centimetres deep, were made of oak, yew, and possibly willow. The boats were paddle propelled. Other notable constructional features are that they were complex boats: carved; dugout (extended); mortice-and-tenon; and sewn.

Recent times
In more recent times, since the Republic of Ireland joined the European Union, Lough Lene is also known as the first freshwater lake to obtain a Blue Flag for its pollution-free water. This has been allocated with remarkable regularity to Lough Lene due to the surrounding agricultural communities' commitment to preserving this water resource and habitat for fish and wildlife by careful management of effluent from their farms. Lough Lene's clear water also acts as a reservoir for many surrounding villages. Collinstown, Rickardstown and Glenidan have formed a GAA club called the Lough Lene Gaels.

Water sport activities
Swimming, sailing and windsurfing are popular. Dressing-rooms and picnic areas are available to tourists at the point locally referred to as "the Cut" about 2 km north from the Collinstown cross-roads. "The Cut"  is situated on the east end of the lake.

Due to the excellent quality and remarkable clarity of the water together with the safe access at "the Cut"  the lough is a very popular bathing and swimming location suitable for families and experienced swimmers/Triathletes alike. Local Triathlon clubs and Meath Masters Swimming Club train and hold events here regularly. In Summertime average water temperatures are around 17c,  sometimes a few degrees higher during periods of good weather.  One of the more popular training swims is out to Turgesius Island a distance of exactly one mile from the slipway at the cut.  Whilst a "safe" lake in the sense that access and egress are easy,  during periods of moderate or stronger, due westerly winds swimming can become very challenging as waves can quickly form and swimmers are advised to stay close to shore. In 2022 a permanent "swim trail" of 5 large swimmers buoys was laid out along the North Shore in a 750m course, (1500 return) to encourage the safe participation of more swimming. More buoys were also installed in the separate designated bathing area.   

Jet-skis and water-skiing are prohibited on Lough Lene.

Special areas of conservation
The European Union's Habitats Directive (92/43EEC) requires member states of the EU to protect wildlife areas. The European Communities (Natural Habitats) Regulations 1977, as amended, implements the directive in the Republic.

It is a clear hard water lake with marl deposition particularly noticeable along long stretches of its shores.

The lake supports a range of pondweeds that include Potamogeton perfoliatus and P. lucens, Canadian pondweed (Elodea canadensis), and a variety of stoneworts (Chara spp., such as C. pedunculata and C. curta) which are marl or hard-water lake indicators.

A stony shore line fringes much of the lake, where there are species such as spike-rush (Eleocharis sp.) jointed rush (Polygonum persicaria), marsh pennywort (Hydrocotyle vulgaris), and sedges (Carex spp.). A narrow fringe of emigerent plant species dominated by common reed (Phragmites australis) and common club-rush (Schoenoplectus lacustris) occurs along some stretches of the lakeshore.

Patches of wet woodland colonise former areas of cut-away and other low-lying areas close to the lake and are dominated by willows (Salix spp.), birch (Betula sp.) and alder (Alnus glutinosa) with patches of common reed also occurring. These areas support a rich flora. The ground flora of the wood at the northwestern end of the lake includes a range of peat mosses (Sphagnum spp.), bilberry (Vaccinium myrtillus) and heather (Calluna vulgaris). Alder carr occurs on the juttland into the lake at its northwestern side.

Freshwater marsh/fen vegetation, with such species as purple moor-grass (Molinia caerulea), bottle sedge (Carex rostrata), black bog-rush (Schoenus nigricans), and marsh cinquefoil (Potentilla palustris), occurs in certain areas near the lake; one such area supports a population of rare round-leaved wintergreen (Pyrola rotundifolia subsp. rotundifolia).

Bird life
There are many bird species on Lough Lene, in particular, mute swan, teal, pochard, great crested grebe, little grebe, tufted duck, grey heron, water rail, mallard, goldeneye, cormorant and wigeon. The surrounding lands are inhabited by snipe, lapwing and curlew. Of particular significance is the pochard population which, in the winters of 1995/1996 and 1996/1997, there were numbers of national importance averaging 515 individual birds of this population.

Much of the lake shore is accessible to grazing cattle, goats, sheep and horses. Unpolluted hard-water lakes such as Lough Lene are becoming increasingly rare in Ireland and in Europe and are of a type that is listed upon the Annex of the E.U. Habitat Directive.

Crayfish
Lough Lene had a notable population of fresh water crayfish, a species that is listed on Annex II of the E.U. Habitats Directive. This species disappeared from Lough Lene in 1987 following an outbreak of crayfish fungus plague. The species was re-introduced and breeding was recorded in 1995. Since then, a further outbreak of the crayfish fungus plague has once again led to the disappearance of the species from Lough Lene.

Gallery

See also
List of loughs in Ireland

External links and references
 Westmeath County Council information;laws, etc
 Ordnance Survey of Ireland (maps no. 41 and no.42)
 Viking Ireland Network school project
 Lough Lene Monks Boat
 Associated L.Lene boat text
 Lough Lene Gaels
 Community pages
 The Cut, Lough Lene

References 

Lene
Archaeological sites in County Westmeath
Stone Age Europe
Lene